Money and Government: The Past and Future of Economics is a 2018 book about the history of economics by Robert Skidelsky.

Further reading

External links 
 

2018 non-fiction books
Books about the history of economic thought
English-language books
Allen Lane (imprint) books